Korgen Church is a parish church of the Church of Norway in Hemnes Municipality in Nordland county, Norway. It is located in the village of Korgen. It is the church for the Korgen parish which is part of the Indre Helgeland prosti (deanery) in the Diocese of Sør-Hålogaland. The white, wooden church was built in a cruciform style in 1863 using plans drawn up by the architect Andreas Grenstad. The church seats about 450 people.

Media gallery

See also
List of churches in Nordland

References

Hemnes
Churches in Nordland
Wooden churches in Norway
Cruciform churches in Norway
19th-century Church of Norway church buildings
Churches completed in 1863
1863 establishments in Norway